Amundsenia is a genus of saxicolous lichens in the family Teloschistaceae. It has two species. The genus was circumscribed in 2014 by Isaac Garrido-Benavent, Ulrik Søchting, Sergio Pérez-Ortega, and Rod Seppelt, with Amundsenia austrocontinentalis assigned as the type species. The type is known only from continental Antarctica, while Amundsenia approximata only occurs in the Arctic.

The genus name honours Norwegian polar explorer Roald Amundsen (1872–1928), "the first man to reach the South Pole".

References

Lichen genera
Teloschistales
Taxa described in 2014
Teloschistales genera